Decatur County is a county located in the U.S. state of Georgia. As of the 2020 census, the population was 29,367. The county seat is Bainbridge.

Decatur County comprises the Bainbridge, GA Micropolitan Statistical Area, which is included in the Tallahassee-Bainbridge, FL-GA Combined Statistical Area.

History
The county was created by an act of the Georgia General Assembly on December 8, 1823, from a portion of Early County. Three other counties were created from land that was originally part of Decatur County.

In 1825, a portion of Decatur was used in the creation of Thomas County. In 1905, another portion of Decatur was used in the creation of part of Grady County. In 1920, the western portion of Decatur County was used to form Seminole County in its entirety.

Decatur County is named for United States Navy Commodore Stephen Decatur, a hero of the War of 1812.

Geography

The bulk of Decatur County, from northeast to southwest, and centered on Bainbridge, is located in the Lower Flint River sub-basin of the ACF River Basin (Apalachicola-Chattahoochee-Flint River Basin). Almost all of the county's western border is located in the Spring Creek sub-basin of the same ACF River Basin. The southwestern portion of Decatur County, centered on Attapulgus, and bordered on the west by State Route 302, is located on the Lower Ochlockonee River sub-basin of the larger Ochlockonee River basin. Finally, the county's southwestern corner, west of State Route 302, is located in the Apalachicola River sub-basin of the same larger ACF River basin.

Major highways

  U.S. Route 27
  U.S. Route 27 Business
  U.S. Route 84
  U.S. Route 84 Business
  State Route 1
  State Route 1 Business
  State Route 38
  State Route 97
  State Route 97 Spur
  State Route 241
  State Route 253
  State Route 253 Spur
  State Route 262
  State Route 285
  State Route 302
  State Route 302 Spur
  State Route 309
  State Route 310
  State Route 311

Adjacent counties
 Miller County - north
 Mitchell County - northeast
 Baker County - northeast
 Grady County - east
 Gadsden County, Florida - south
 Seminole County - west

Demographics

2000 census
As of the census of 2000, there were 28,240 people, 10,380 households, and 7,546 families living in the county. There were 11,968 housing units at an average density of 20 per square mile (8/km2). The racial makeup of the county was 57.10% White, 39.91% Black or African American, 0.24% Native American, 0.33% Asian, 0.04% Pacific Islander, 1.64% from other races, and 0.74% from two or more races.  3.20% of the population were Hispanic or Latino of any race.

There were 10,380 households, out of which 35.40% had children under the age of 18 living with them, 49.00% were married couples living together, 19.50% had a female householder with no husband present, and 27.30% were non-families. 24.30% of all households were made up of individuals, and 10.40% had someone living alone who was 65 years of age or older.  The average household size was 2.65 and the average family size was 3.14.

In the county, the population was spread out, with 28.50% under the age of 18, 9.10% from 18 to 24, 28.00% from 25 to 44, 21.10% from 45 to 64, and 13.30% who were 65 years of age or older.  The median age was 34 years. For every 100 females, there were 91.00 males.  For every 100 females age 18 and over, there were 85.90 males.

The median income for a household in the county was $28,820, and the median income for a family was $32,635. Males had a median income of $27,180 versus $20,745 for females. The per capita income for the county was $15,063.  About 19.20% of families and 22.70% of the population were below the poverty line, including 33.00% of those under age 18 and 19.20% of those age 65 or over.

2010 census
As of the 2010 United States Census, there were 27,842 people, 10,390 households, and 7,255 families living in the county. The racial makeup of the county was 54.2% white, 41.1% black or African American, 0.5% Asian, 0.4% American Indian, 2.5% from other races, and 1.2% from two or more races. Those of Hispanic or Latino origin made up 5.0% of the population. In terms of ancestry, 9.8% were American, 5.9% were English, and 5.7% were Irish.

Of the 10,390 households, 35.4% had children under the age of 18 living with them, 44.7% were married couples living together, 20.0% had a female householder with no husband present, 30.2% were non-families, and 26.4% of all households were made up of individuals. The average household size was 2.58 and the average family size was 3.10. The median age was 37.7 years.

The median income for a household in the county was $33,297 and the median income for a family was $44,322. Males had a median income of $36,176 versus $25,750 for females. The per capita income for the county was $17,833. About 19.4% of families and 24.0% of the population were below the poverty line, including 32.9% of those under age 18 and 18.7% of those age 65 or over.

2020 census

As of the 2020 United States Census, there were 29,367 people, 10,084 households, and 7,113 families residing in the county.

Education
Decatur County School District is the local school district with Bainbridge High School being the local high school.

Spring Creek Charter Academy was formed in 2019 and includes grades Pre-K through 9th Grade as of 2023-2024 school year with the next year being added as each grade progresses through the years.

Abraham Baldwin Agricultural College has a satellite campus in Bainbridge.

Southern Regional Technical College has a satellite campus in Bainbridge serving the county.

Communities

Cities
 Attapulgus
 Bainbridge
 Climax

Town
 Brinson

Unincorporated communities
 Amsterdam
 Ausmac
 Cyrene
 Eldorendo
 Faceville
 Fowlstown
 Vada

Politics

See also

 National Register of Historic Places listings in Decatur County, Georgia
 Sowegalive.com - Bainbridge, GA News, Radio and Community Information
List of counties in Georgia

References
General

Specific
 The New Georgia Encyclopedia entry for Decatur County

External links

 Decatur County historical marker
 Amsterdam historical marker
 Cyrene historical marker

 
1823 establishments in Georgia (U.S. state)
Populated places established in 1823
Georgia (U.S. state) counties
Micropolitan areas of Georgia (U.S. state)
Majority-minority counties in Georgia